Networker Turbo may refer to three related classes of diesel multiple unit members of the Networker family of trains built for British Rail, the United Kingdom's then state owned rail operator, between 1990 and 1993:

 British Rail Class 165, in service with both Chiltern Railways and Great Western Railway
 British Rail Class 166, a faster air conditioned variant of the 165 in service with Great Western Railway
 British Rail Class 168, a later partial derivative of the 165 in service with Chiltern Railways